Ernest C. Keppler (April 5, 1918May 23, 2001) was an American lawyer, jurist, and Republican politician from the U.S. state of Wisconsin.  He served six years (1979–1985) as a Wisconsin circuit court judge in Sheboygan County, after representing Ozaukee and Sheboygan counties in the Wisconsin State Senate for 18 years (1961–1979).

Biography

Born in Sheboygan, Wisconsin, Keppler graduated from the University of Wisconsin and received his law degree from the University of Wisconsin Law School. Keppler served on the Sheboygan Common Council. In 1943, he served in the Wisconsin State Assembly. Keppler served in the United States Army during World War II and the Korean War. In 1961, Keppler began serving in the Wisconsin State Senate. In 1979, he was elected a Wisconsin Circuit Court judge, for Sheboygan County, Wisconsin.

Keppler was married to Bertha Keppler. They had two children, Ernest Michael Keppler and Mary Keppler (Schmidt).

References

Politicians from Sheboygan, Wisconsin
University of Wisconsin–Madison alumni
University of Wisconsin Law School alumni
Wisconsin city council members
Wisconsin state court judges
Members of the Wisconsin State Assembly
Wisconsin state senators
1918 births
2001 deaths
20th-century American judges
20th-century American politicians